Elections for Corby Borough Council, which covers the Borough of Corby, were held on 3 May 2007. Labour retained overall control of the council. There had been a number of boundary changes since the 2003 elections. The overall results, using average ward votes for the total number of votes cast, were as follows:

(Vote counts shown are ward averages)

Ward-by-Ward Results

Beanfield Ward (2 seats)

(Vote count shown is ward average)

Central Ward (1 seat)

(Vote count shown is ward average)

Danesholme Ward (2 seats)

(Vote count shown is ward average)

East Ward (3 seats)

(Vote count shown is ward average)

Exeter Ward (1 seat)

(Vote count shown is ward average)

Great Oakley (1 seat)

(Vote count shown is ward average)

Kingswood Ward (3 seats)

(Vote count shown is ward average)

Lodge Park (2 seats)

(Vote count shown is ward average)

Oakley Vale Ward (3 seats)

(Vote count shown is ward average)

Rowlett Ward (2 seats)

(Vote count shown is ward average)

Rural West Ward (1 seat)

(Vote count shown is ward average)

Shire Lodge (2 seats)

(Vote count shown is ward average)

Stanion and Corby Village Ward (2 seats)

(Vote count shown is ward average)

Tower Hill Ward (2 seats)

(Vote count shown is ward average)

Weldon and Gretton Ward (2 seats)

(Vote count shown is ward average)

See also
Corby (UK Parliament constituency)

References

2007 English local elections
2007
2000s in Northamptonshire